Muddu in Telugu language means Kiss.

 Muddu Bidda is a 1956 Telugu Drama film directed and produced by K. B. Tilak.
 Muddu Palani was a Telugu speaking poet and devadasi attached to the court of Pratap Singh, the Maratha king of Tanjore.

te:ముద్దు